The South African Wool Board was constituted in 1946 as an independent and non-profit making statutory board under the Wool Act (Act No 19 of 1946) in response to the rapid rise synthetic replacements for natural wool fibre. It was wound up in 1997.

Objectives
Improve marketing research, advertising and technical research of South Africa's wool and wool textiles.

History
The board was founded in 1946 under the Wool Act (Act No 19 of 1946). In 1972 the Wool Commission was merged with it. It was wound up in 1997.

Funding
It was funded by a levy imposed on all wool sales in the Union of South Africa.

See also
 South African Wool
 International Wool Secretariat
 Australian Wool Board
 New Zealand Wool Board
 British Wool Marketing Board

References

Marketing boards
Wool organizations
Agricultural organisations based in South Africa